Exiles on Asperus  is a collection of science fiction short stories by British writer John Wyndham, writing as John Beynon, published in 1979 after his death by Coronet Books.

Contents
The collection contains:

"Exiles on Asperus" (1933)
"No Place Like Earth" (1951)
"The Venus Adventure" (1932)

"Exiles on Asperus" tells the story of a human crew who are transporting a group of Martian dissidents to a penal colony only for the captives to revolt leading to the crew, prisoners, and the survivors of a previous crash becoming embroiled in a battle for survival against the indigenous life form of the planet Asperus.

Exiles on Asperus was originally published in the Winter 1933 issue of a pulp magazine, Wonder Stories Quarterly.

"No Place Like Earth" sees a survivor of the Earth's destruction facing a slow, quiet life on Mars or becoming part of the efforts to keep humanity alive on Venus, and the repercussions of his decision.

"The Venus Adventure" tells of an early flight to Venus and the surprising world the crew of the Fyra discover. Not only are there intelligent indigenous lifeforms, and a breathable atmosphere, there are also fellow humans.

External links
  (Short story of the same title)

1979 short story collections
Books published posthumously
Coronet Books books
Short story collections by John Wyndham